iPadOS 16 is the fourth and current major release of the iPadOS operating system developed by Apple for its iPad line of tablet computers. The successor to iPadOS 15, it was announced at the company's Worldwide Developers Conference (WWDC) on June 6, 2022, along with iOS 16, macOS Ventura, watchOS 9, and tvOS 16. It received numerous new features, improving multitasking and many other aspects of the operating system, most notably on iPads with Apple's M1 SoC and later.

The public beta of iPadOS 16 was released on July 11, 2022. The public version of iPadOS 16 was released on October 24, 2022 as iPadOS 16.1.

Features

Freeform

Freeform is a whiteboard app that lets users collaborate together in real time. It was released with iPadOS 16.2.

Weather
For the first time, Apple's Weather app is available on iPad, it was originally only available on iPhone and iPod Touch.

Lock screen
The Lock Screen has a new font and displays the date above the time to match iOS 16, but lacks the new customization features.

Passkeys
iPads will now be able to sign into websites that implement WebAuthn using just the user’s passcode or biometrics.

Stage Manager 
On iPads with Apple A12X Bionic, Apple A12Z Bionic, Apple M1 and Apple M2 processors, Stage Manager displays up to four apps at a time in adjustable windows. In addition, on iPads with Apple M1 and later, external displays are now driven using Stage Manager instead of screen mirroring, enabling display scaling on external displays.

Display scaling mode 
On iPads with Apple M1 processors and later, and iPad Pro 11-inch with Apple A12X Bionic and A12Z Bionic processors, Display scaling mode allows more view space in apps by increasing the pixel density of the display.

Reference Mode 
On the iPad Pro 12.9-inch (5th generation) and (6th generation) with Liquid Retina XDR display, the iPad can be used in "Reference Mode" for color-graded work. This extends to Sidecar, as long as the Mac being connected to has Apple Silicon.

Spoken Content 
As with iOS 16, some already supported languages have received additional voices (including "Novelty" voices for English), and voices and support have been added for the following languages:
Bangla
Basque
Bhojpuri
Bulgarian
Catalan
Croatian
Galician
Kannada
Malay
Marathi
Persian
Shanghainese
Slovenian
Tamil
Telugu
Ukrainian
Vietnamese

Notes
More text indentation features are added, as well as the ability to create column tables.

Files 
Allows the changing of file extensions and showing all file extensions.

Photos
Touch ID, Face ID or passcode is now required to view the Hidden and Recently Deleted albums, unless the user turns this off in Settings.
Photos can now detect duplicate photos or videos. The user can choose to delete the duplicates or to merge them, so that the device retains the higher quality photo with relevant data from the duplicate(s).

App toolbar 
Allows the customisation of toolbars to add tools, as well as editing the position of tools.

Criticism

iPadOS 16's Stage Manager feature has been criticized by various sources for only being supported by certain iPad models with an M1 chip or M2 chip owing to strict performance requirements. In an interview with TechCrunch, Craig Federighi explained “It’s only the M1 iPads that combined the high DRAM capacity with very high capacity, high-performance NAND that allows our virtual memory swap to be super fast”. It was later discovered that the feature is disabled for older devices by an internal setting. Due to criticism, a single-screen version of Stage Manager was added on 2018 and 2020 iPad Pros in iPadOS 16.1 beta. Apple later provided a statement to Engadget, stating that “…customers with iPad Pro 3rd and 4th generation have expressed strong interest in being able to experience Stage Manager on their iPads. In response, our teams have worked hard to find a way to deliver a single-screen version for these systems, with support for up to four live apps on the iPad screen at once”.

External display support for Stage Manager on M1 iPads was delayed until further notice by Apple due to instability, and was brought back in the iPadOS 16.2 update.

Stage Manager was also criticized for being "hard to use" and some reviewers and critics called the feature "fundamentally misguided".

The lack of iOS 16's lock screen customization features was also criticized by reviewers such as David Pierce from The Verge. iPadOS had a hidden lock screen customization app named PostBoard which included the iOS 16’s lock screen customization features in iPadOS 16 Beta 1.

Supported devices
iPadOS 16 is supported on iPads with A9 or A9X chips or newer, dropping support for the iPad Air 2 and iPad Mini 4, both with A8 or A8X chips. This also marks the second time Apple has dropped support for older 64-bit iPads. The supported devices are as follows.
 iPad (5th generation)
 iPad (6th generation)
 iPad (7th generation)
 iPad (8th generation)
 iPad (9th generation)
 iPad (10th generation)
 iPad Air (3rd generation)
 iPad Air (4th generation)
 iPad Air (5th generation)
 iPad Mini (5th generation)
 iPad Mini (6th generation)
 iPad Pro 9.7-inch
 iPad Pro 12.9-inch (1st generation)
 iPad Pro 10.5-inch
 iPad Pro 12.9-inch (2nd generation)
 iPad Pro 11-inch (1st generation)
 iPad Pro 12.9-inch (3rd generation)
 iPad Pro 11-inch (2nd generation)
 iPad Pro 12.9-inch (4th generation)
 iPad Pro 11-inch (3rd generation)
 iPad Pro 12.9-inch (5th generation)
 iPad Pro 11-inch (4th generation)
 iPad Pro 12.9-inch (6th generation)

Releases 

The first developer beta of iPadOS 16 was released on June 6, 2022. The first public release, iPadOS 16.1, was officially released on October 24, 2022.

See Apple's official release notes, and official security update contents.

See also 
 iOS 16
 macOS Ventura
 watchOS 9
 tvOS 16

References

16
IPad
Apple Inc. operating systems
Mach (kernel)
Mobile operating systems
Products introduced in 2022
Tablet operating systems